Ectropis excursaria, the twig looper, is a moth of the  family Geometridae. It is found in the Eastern part of Australia.

The wingspan is 30–45 mm, with the females being larger than the males.

The larvae feed on a wide range of plants, including Hedera helix, Pelargonium zonale, Juglans regia, Salvia officinalis, Pinus radiata, Rosa odorata, Gardenia jasminoides, Citrus limon, Hardenbergia violacea and Cassia, Acacia, Eucalyptus, Bursaria and Hakea species.

References

Boarmiini
Moths described in 1857